Macedonian language may refer to:

 Macedonian language, designation for a South Slavic language spoken by ethnic Macedonians
 Ancient Macedonian language, designation for a Greek dialect spoken by ancient Macedonians

See also
 Macedonia (disambiguation)
 Macedonian (disambiguation)
 Languages of Macedonia (disambiguation)
 Slavic languages of Macedonia (disambiguation)